The EJP County Line Bridge is a Camelback pony truss bridge located near Hyattville, Wyoming, which carries Big Horn County Road CN9-60 across the Nowood River. The bridge was built in 1917 by the Monarch Engineering Company. As the bridge was originally thought to connect Big Horn and Washakie Counties, the two counties split the cost of the bridge, with each paying for one abutment and the two splitting the cost of the superstructure; this is the only recorded case of two Wyoming counties purchasing a bridge in such a way. Further surveys determined that the bridge is actually located entirely within Big Horn County.

The bridge was added to the National Register of Historic Places in 1985. It was one of several bridges added to the National Register for their role in the history of Wyoming bridge construction.

References

External links

Road bridges on the National Register of Historic Places in Wyoming
Bridges completed in 1917
Buildings and structures in Big Horn County, Wyoming
Truss bridges in the United States
National Register of Historic Places in Big Horn County, Wyoming
1917 establishments in Wyoming